Commiphora schimperi, also known as glossy-leaved corkwood, is a tree species in the genus Commiphora, which is native to Namibia, Zimbabwe and northern South Africa.

References

schimperi
Flora of Namibia
Flora of Zimbabwe
Flora of South Africa